Alignments is Double Experience's third full-length album, released worldwide on April 24, 2020 via Drakkar Entertainment.

Alignments consisted of three three-song EPs - Alignments: Neutral, Alignments: Good and Alignments: Evil - which were released before the full-length album on Nov 1, 2019, Jan 2020, and March 13, 2020 respectively. The lead single “New Me”, was released from Alignments: Neutral on October 24, 2019.

Track listing

Personnel 
Ian Nichols – vocals, bass, lyrics 
Brock Tinsley – guitars, lyrics
Kail Carbon – drums
Al Jacob – production, mixing, lead engineer, additional instrumentation
Matt Tuttle – Mastering
Kidpixel  – artwork

Critical reception 

Upon its release, Alignments received positive reviews. Katie Bird of Distorted Sound Magazine gave the album an 8/10, noting that “Double Experience [had] shown growth as they master progressive rock”.

On April 28, Alignments received a Capital Music Award nomination for "Album of the Year".

References 

2020 albums
Double Experience albums